The Collegiate Middle Level Association (CMLA) is a student association designed to promote and support the professional development of future middle level teachers, as well as the development and nurturing of middle level education programs.  CMLA is an affiliate of National Middle School Association.  Currently, Otterbein College is serving as the national host site for the organization's leadership.  Their two-year leadership term will conclude November 2011 with CMLA's annual meeting at NMSA's headquarters in Columbus, OH.

Purpose of CMLA

Advance appropriate middle level education
Provide information about starting and maintaining an organized group of students involved in middle level education on college and university campuses.
Support standards and recommendations which enhance middle level concepts, practices and ideas.
Publicize current middle level employment opportunities.
Promote and invite collegiate participation at national, state and regional middle level conferences.
Support and encourage students of middle level education, and inform members of the progress and activities of both CMLA and other student groups via newsletters, electronic technology and other sources of communication.

Collegiate Middle Level Association: A Historical Perspective

John Swaim,
CMLA Advisory Chair

The Collegiate Middle Level Association currently has 31 chapters. These 31 chapters represent a growing number of colleges and universities who are now preparing teachers to teach young adolescents in American's middle schools. This would have been an unthinkable dream for a handful of college students in the middle school teacher education program at the University of Northern Colorado who were trying to create a national organization for students preparing to become middle school teachers in 1988. At that time there were only 18 states that had middle school certification or endorsement as opposed to 46 states today. In 1988 middle school teacher education programs were the exception rather than the rule. Even more rare were middle school teacher education programs with active student organizations. As the decade of the 90s began there were only four higher education institutions that had active middle school student groups, University of Northern Colorado, University of Northern Iowa, Illinois State University, and Appalachian State University.

In 1989, under the leadership of Ned Gilardino, a UNC student, a constitution was drafted and the Student Association for Middle Education (SAME) was born. Its name was later changed to Collegiate Middle Level Association (CMLA). That same year CMLA made a presentation to the NMSA Board of Trustees. The Board recognized CLMA and agreed to help finance them by sharing a percentage of the membership fee of all college students who joined NMSA and had an interest in also becoming a member of CMLA. However, joining by individual membership did not provide the stability that was needed to help the association grow. In fact, when the elections were held the officers often came from several different campuses which made it difficult to conduct the business of the association.

Then, in 1995 two significant events occurred that moved CMLA to a new level. First, NMSA recognized CMLA as an official affiliate member, joining other state middle school associations. Secondly, CMLA moved from an individual membership to a chapter membership. The constitution underwent major revisions that not only changed membership from individual to chapter membership, but also changed how the association would be financed and governed. An advisory board was established consisting of the chapter advisors of all the member chapters. The officers were now elected from one campus that applied and was approved by the advisory board to be the host site for a two-year term. Financing was more closely aligned with NMSA. The association was able to have two annual meetings rather than just meeting at the NMSA annual conference.

At first CMLA grew slowly under this newly revised structure. However, as more states legislated middle school teacher licensure and more colleges and universities began to develop middle school teacher education programs, CMLA provided an ever increasing number of prospective middle school teachers the opportunity to become professionally involved as middle level educators.

The following colleges and universities have been leadership host sites for CMLA since the new restructuring: Otterbein College (2009–Present); Georgia College & State University (2007-2009); University of Dayton (2005-2007); Ashland University (2003-2005); Appalachian State University (2001-2003); Central Michigan University (1999-2001); Missouri Southern State University (1997-1999); and Illinois State University (1995-1997).

Current Chapters

Appalachian State University
Arkansas Tech University
Armstrong Atlantic State University
Ashland University
Baylor University
Bethany College
Bowling Green State University
Central Michigan University
Clayton State University
Cleveland State University
College of Charleston
Dillard University
East Carolina University
Eastern Kentucky University
Georgia College & State University
Georgia Regents University
Heidelberg College
Hiram College
Humboldt State University
Illinois State University
Lee University
Lewis University
Missouri Southern State University
Morehead State University
Murray State University
North Georgia College and State University
Northern Kentucky University
Otterbein College (National Host Site)
Portland State University
Rhode Island College
Southern Illinois University
Southwest Baptist University
Southwest Missouri State University
Texas A&M University
University of Arkansas
University of Central Arkansas
University of North Carolina
University of Rio Grande
University of Texas
University of Cincinnati
University of Dayton
University of Maine
Youngstown State University

External links
https://archive.today/20130209053242/http://national-cmla.wikispaces.com/  National CMLA Wiki (Website)
http://www.nmsa.org/AboutNMSA/AffiliateOrganizations/CollegiateMiddleLevelAssociation/tabid/553/Default.aspx Collegiate Middle Level Association  (Website)
http://www.nmsa.org National Middle School Association  (Website)

United States schools associations
Educational administration